Bulbothrix is a genus of lichen-forming fungi in the family Parmeliaceae. This genus is synonymous with Bulbothricella V.Marcano, S.Mohali & A.Morales. Bulbothrix was circumscribed by lichenologist Mason E. Hale in 1974 with Bulbothrix semilunata as the type species.

Species

Bulbothrix apophysata 
Bulbothrix asiatica 
Bulbothrix australiensis 
Bulbothrix bicornuta 
Bulbothrix bulbillosa  – Galápagos Islands
Bulbothrix caribensis 
Bulbothrix cassa  – Brazil
Bulbothrix cinerea 
Bulbothrix goebelii 
Bulbothrix isidiza 
Bulbothrix johannis 
Bulbothrix klementii 
Bulbothrix lacinia 
Bulbothrix lacinulata  – Brazil
Bulbothrix laeviuscula 
Bulbothrix lobarica  – Brazil
Bulbothrix lordhowensis 
Bulbothrix lyngei 
Bulbothrix mammillaria 
Bulbothrix megapotamica 
Bulbothrix microscopica  – Australia
Bulbothrix pseudocoronata 
Bulbothrix pseudofungicola  – Brazil
Bulbothrix queenslandica 
Bulbothrix regnelliana  – Brazil
Bulbothrix semilunata 
Bulbothrix silicisrea  – Brazil
Bulbothrix sipmanii  – Guyana
Bulbothrix subscortea 
Bulbothrix subtabacina 
Bulbothrix tabacina 
Bulbothrix thomasiana 
Bulbothrix vainioi  – Brazil
Bulbothrix ventricosa 
Bulbothrix viatica  – Brazil
Bulbothrix yunnana  – China

References

Parmeliaceae
Lecanorales genera
Lichen genera
Taxa named by Mason Hale
Taxa described in 1974